Fred Wright (June 24, 1907 – December 29, 1984) was an American labor cartoonist and activist who created "thousands" of illustrated news strips as a staff cartoonist for the United Electrical, Radio and Machine Workers of America (UE). His first published cartoon appeared in The Pilot, a publication owned by the National Maritime Union, in 1939. In 1949, the UE hired Wright as a staff cartoonist, for whom he worked until his death on December 29, 1984.

Early life
Wright was born on June 24, 1907, in Derby, England. With his family, Wright immigrated to America during childhood. Wright learned to draw from his grandfather, an amateur artist who worked as a striper in automobile factories. As a teenager, Wright played saxophone professionally in clip joints and resorts; in the late 1920s, Wright attended classes at the New York Art Students League (NYASL). According to Paul Buhle in Encyclopedia of the American Left, the Great Depression "truly radicalized" Wright. On ships, where he worked as a musician, Wright met National Maritime Union (NMU) organizers.

Cartoonist
Wright's first published cartoon appeared in The Pilot, a publication owned by the NMU, in 1939.

Artistically, Buhle stated Wright's work "heralded the abandonment of the symbolic proletarian muscular giant in favor of a more workaday Joe (or Jane) fighting back against inflation, automation, and employer attacks," while his "Art Young-type philosophical approach to the difficulties of modern existence transcended socialist and class clichés without ... losing ... basic points of unfairness and exploitation." In 1989, John Nichols of The Blade described Wright as the "father of modern labor cartooning". Buhle categorized Wright as the second-most widely published labor cartoonist after Young.

Later life
Wright died of cancer on December 29, 1984, while in creation of a cartoon history on the Industrial Revolution.

References

Further reading
 Digitized collection of Wright cartoons
 Collection of Wright cartoons

1907 births
1984 deaths
American cartoonists
United Electrical, Radio and Machine Workers of America people
English emigrants to the United States